In the episode of Star Trek: The Original Series titled "Plato's Stepchildren", season 3 episode 10, first broadcast November 22, 1968, Uhura (played by black actress Nichelle Nichols) and Captain Kirk (played by white actor William Shatner) kiss. The episode is often—incorrectly—cited as the first example of an interracial kiss on television.

Background
The first interracial kiss on television is debated, with several examples identified in the 1950s. For example, Shatner had another interracial kiss more than 10 years earlier on a 1958 episode of The Ed Sullivan Show, when he kissed France Nuyen, a person of Asian ancestry. This was during a scene from the Broadway production of The World of Suzie Wong.

Production
In the first season episode "What Are Little Girls Made Of?", first broadcast in October 1966, there is a friendly kiss between Uhura, played by Nichols and Christine Chapel, played by Majel Barrett. Later in the season, in the episode "Space Seed", there is also a kiss between characters played by Ricardo Montalbán and Madlyn Rhue.

In the second season episode "Mirror, Mirror," first broadcast on October 6, 1967, Kirk and Lt. Marlena Moreau, played by BarBara Luna, an actress of Filipino-European ancestry, kiss on the lips. Meanwhile, Mirror-Sulu, played by Japanese-American actor George Takei, kisses Uhura's neck.

In "Plato's Stepchildren," which was broadcast in 1968, the kiss is involuntarily forced by psychokinesis. Shatner recalls in Star Trek Memories that NBC insisted their lips never touch, using the technique of turning their heads away from the camera to conceal this. However, Nichols writes in her 1994 autobiography, Beyond Uhura, that the kiss was real, even during takes in which her head obscures their lips. She also gave this account in multiple recorded interviews.

When NBC executives learned of the kiss they became concerned it would anger TV stations in the Deep South. Earlier in 1968, NBC had expressed similar concern over a musical sequence in a Petula Clark special in which she touched Harry Belafonte's arm, a moment that has been incorrectly cited as the first physical contact on American television between a man and woman of different races. At one point during negotiations, the idea was brought up of having Spock kiss Uhura instead (as Spock was half Vulcan), but William Shatner insisted that they stick with the original script. NBC finally ordered that two versions of the scene be shot—one in which Kirk and Uhura kissed and one in which they did not. Having successfully filmed the former version of the scene, Shatner and Nichelle Nichols deliberately flubbed every take of the latter version, thus forcing the episode to go out with the kiss intact.

As Nichols recounts:

Knowing that Gene was determined to air the real kiss, Bill shook me and hissed menacingly in his best ham-fisted Kirkian staccato delivery, "I! WON'T! KISS! YOU! I! WON'T! KISS! YOU!"

It was absolutely awful, and we were hysterical and ecstatic. The director was beside himself, and still determined to get the kissless shot. So we did it again, and it seemed to be fine. "Cut! Print! That's a wrap!"

The next day they screened the dailies, and although I rarely attended them, I couldn't miss this one. Everyone watched as Kirk and Uhura kissed and kissed and kissed. And I'd like to set the record straight: Although Kirk and Uhura fought it, they did kiss in every single scene. When the non-kissing scene came on, everyone in the room cracked up. The last shot, which looked okay on the set, actually had Bill wildly crossing his eyes. It was so corny and just plain bad it was unusable. The only alternative was to cut out the scene altogether, but that was impossible to do without ruining the entire episode. Finally, the guys in charge relented: "To hell with it. Let's go with the kiss." I guess they figured we were going to be cancelled in a few months anyway. And so the kiss stayed.

Reception 
There are no records of any public complaints about the scene. Nichols observed that "Plato's Stepchildren", which first aired on November 22, 1968, "received a huge response. We received one of the largest batches of fan mail ever, all of it very positive, with many addressed to me from girls wondering how it felt to kiss Captain Kirk, and many to him from guys wondering the same thing about me. However, almost no one found the kiss offensive," except from a single mildly negative letter from one white Southerner who wrote: "I am totally opposed to the mixing of the races. However, any time a red-blooded American boy like Captain Kirk gets a beautiful dame in his arms that looks like Uhura, he ain't gonna fight it." Nichols said "for me, the most memorable episode of our last season was 'Plato's Stepchildren.'"

In 2016, TVline ranked the kiss as one of the top 20 moments of Star Trek. In 2016, Radio Times ranked the kiss as the 25th best moment in all Star Trek, including later spin-off series. The cultural impact of the kiss was noted by National Geographic, in 2016. WhatCulture ranked this the 8th best romantic-sexual moment in Star Trek.

See also
 "Rejoined", a Star Trek: Deep Space Nine episode in which two female Trills kiss
 Golden Boy, Lorna Moon and Sammy Davis Jr. 1964

References

Star Trek: The Original Series
William Shatner
1968 in American television
Kissing
Fiction about interracial romance
November 1968 events